The 1993–94 Scottish First Division season was won by Falkirk, who were promoted one point ahead of Dunfermline Athletic. Due to a league restructuring, five teams, Dumbarton, Stirling Albion, Clyde, Morton and Brechin City were relegated.

Table

References

Scottish First Division seasons
Scot
2